Mark A. Johnson is an American men's basketball coach, currently coaching at Fort Hays State University. Prior to his position, Johnson served as the assistant coach for the program from 1996 to 2001, as well as interim head coach leading up to the 1997–98 season. Prior to becoming an assistant coach at Fort Hays State, Johnson was an assistant at Phillips University, Labette Community College, and served as a graduate assistant for Pittsburg State University. Mark has 3 children.

Career

Early career 
Johnson, an Omaha, Nebraska native, began as a graduate assistant for his alma mater, Pittsburg State University. After two years, Johnson served as an assistant men's basketball coach for the Labette Cardinals for one season before moving on to Phillips University in a similar position for a season.

Fort Hays State
In 1996, Johnson was hired as an assistant coach at Fort Hays State University. Five years later in July 2001, Johnson was promoted to head coach. Since his promotion in 2001, Johnson has led the Tigers to two conference championships (one in the Rocky Mountain Athletic Conference and the other in the Mid-America Intercollegiate Athletics Association), one MIAA Tournament championship in 2011, nine 20+ win seasons, and seven NCAA Tournament appearances.

Head coaching record

References

External links 
 Fort Hays State profile

Living people
American men's basketball coaches
American men's basketball players
Basketball coaches from Nebraska
Basketball players from Nebraska
College men's basketball head coaches in the United States
Fort Hays State Tigers men's basketball coaches
Phillips Haymakers men's basketball coaches
Pittsburg State Gorillas men's basketball coaches
Pittsburg State Gorillas men's basketball players
Sportspeople from Omaha, Nebraska
Year of birth missing (living people)